The Ichigem Range is a range of mountains in Magadan Oblast and Kamchatka Krai, Russian Far East. 

Administratively most of the range falls within the Penzhinsky District of Kamchatka Krai, but the western end reaches into the Severo-Evensky District of Magadan Oblast.

History
The area of the Ichigem Range was first mapped by geographer and ethnologist Baron Gerhard von Maydell (1835–1894) during his pioneering research of East Siberia.

Geography
The Ichigem Range is the northwesternmost range of the Koryak Highland system. It stretches from WSW to ENE between the upper Penzhina valley to the north and the basin of the Oklan, a Penzhina right tributary, to the south. The Kolyma Mountains rise at the western limit of the range and the waterlogged lower Penzhina valley marks its eastern end.  
The mountains of the Ichigem are of moderate altitude. They are covered with tundra vegetation and have a barren look.

There are numerous vestiges of ancient glaciation in the Ichigem Range, but no modern glaciers. River Oklan has its sources in Mount Stolovaya of the western part of the Ichigem and flows roughly eastwards along the southern limits of the range, beyond which rises the Oklan Plateau (Окланское плато).

See also
List of mountains and hills of Russia

References

External links
Changes on the physical map of Northeast Asia
Александр Смышляев. ГЕОЛОГИ КАМЧАТКИ
Рельеф Камчатки
Mountain ranges of Magadan Oblast
Koryak Mountains
Landforms of Siberia